Ousey is a surname. Notable people with the surname include:

Graham Ousey, American sociology and criminologist
Harry Ousey (1915–1985), British painter

English-language surnames